In His Father's Steps is an American silent film.

Release
The film was released in the United States on August 6, 1912. It played at the Empress Theatre in Wellington, New Zealand, in December, 1912, and in Masterton and at the New Queen's Theatre in Dunedin in January, 1913.

References

External links
 

1912 films
1912 drama films
Silent American drama films
American black-and-white films
American silent short films
1912 short films
Films directed by J. Searle Dawley
1910s American films